Temno may refer to:

 Temno (film), a 1950 Czechoslovak drama film
 Temno (novel), a 1915 Czech novel by Alois Jirásek